Gravy Train is an album by jazz saxophonist Lou Donaldson recorded for the Blue Note  label in 1961 and performed by Donaldson with pianist  Herman Foster, bassist Ben Tucker, drummer Dave Bailey and percussionist Alec Dorsey.

Reception
The album was awarded 3½ stars in an Allmusic review by Steve Huey who states "Gravy Train is a fine, if not quite exceptional record from Lou Donaldson's initial soul-jazz phase of the early '60s... Donaldson's playing is pleasant, and the rest of the supporting group maintains a steady groove throughout".

Track listing
All compositions by Lou Donaldson except where noted

 "Gravy Train" - 8:14
 "South of the Border" (Carr, Kennedy) - 5:31
 "Polka Dots and Moonbeams" (Burke, Van Heusen) - 4:59
 "Avalon" (DeSylva, Jolson, Rose) - 4:15
 "Candy" (Mack David, Kramer, Whitney) - 9:18
 "Twist Time" - 6:47
 "Glory of Love" (Billy Hill) - 4:04

Bonus tracks on CD:
"Gravy Train" [Alternate Take] - 7:30
 "Glory of Love" [Alternate Take] - 3:49

Personnel
Lou Donaldson - alto saxophone
Herman Foster - piano
Ben Tucker - bass
Dave Bailey - drums
Alec Dorsey - congas (1, 2 & 4-9)

References

Lou Donaldson albums
1962 albums
Blue Note Records albums
Albums produced by Alfred Lion
Albums recorded at Van Gelder Studio